Brenner Lake is a lake in Kandiyohi County, in the U.S. state of Minnesota.

Brenner Lake was named for Andreas Hanson Brenner, an early settler.

See also
List of lakes in Minnesota

References

Lakes of Minnesota
Lakes of Kandiyohi County, Minnesota